Steinbach is a small stream on the island of Rügen, Mecklenburg-Vorpommern, Germany. Its source is in the Jasmund National Park, and it flows into the Baltic Sea in the town of Sassnitz.

See also
List of rivers of Mecklenburg-Vorpommern

Rivers of Mecklenburg-Western Pomerania
Rivers of Germany